Szlomo Benjamin Fisz (1922 – 17 November 1989) was a Polish film producer and writer, known for A Town Called Bastard, Aces High, Battle of Britain, The Heroes of Telemark and Hell Drivers.

Biography

Before his film career, Fisz emigrated to the United Kingdom and became a fighter pilot in the Royal Air Force during the Second World War.

Fisz entered the British film industry after the war. He began producing with four films directed by Cy Endfield.  In the 1960s he began producing films about World War II, though efforts to make a film about Orde Wingate did not come to fruition.

Filmography

 The Secret (1955)
 Child in the House  (1956)
 Hell Drivers (1957) 
 Sea Fury (1958) 
 On the Fiddle (1961) 
 The Heroes of Telemark (1965) 
 Battle of Britain (1969)
 A Town Called Bastard (1971) 
 Aces High (1976)
 A Nightingale Sang in Berkeley Square (1979)
 The Jigsaw Man (1983)

References

Bibliography
 Tadeusz Jerzy Krzystek, Anna Krzystek: Polskie Siły Powietrzne w Wielkiej Brytanii w latach 1940-1947 łącznie z Pomocniczą Lotniczą Służbą Kobiet (PLSK-WAAF). Sandomierz: Stratus, 2012, s. 179.

External links
 

Polish film producers
1922 births
1989 deaths
The Few
Polish Royal Air Force pilots of World War II
Polish emigrants to the United Kingdom